North East University Bangladesh also known as NEUB is a private university in Sylhet, Bangladesh. It was established in 2012. The university was founded by Adv. Iqbal Ahmed Chowdhury.

About NEUB
The Government has given approval to North East University Bangladesh in Sylhet.

Academic departments
School of Business 
 Department of Business Administration
School of Law & Justice
 Department of Law & Justice
School of Social Science
 Department of English
 Department of Public Health
 Department of Applied Sociology & Social Work
School of Natural Science & Engineering
 Department of Mathematics & Informatics
 Department of Environment & Chemistry
 Department of Computer Science & Engineering
 Department of Mechanical Engineering

Undergraduate programs
 BBA (Hons.) program	
 B.Sc. (Hons.) Mathematics	
 B.Sc. (Engg.) in Computer Science & Engineering
 B.Sc. (Hons.) in Environmental Science & Chemistry 
 B.A. (Hons.) in English	
 LL.B (Hons.)
 BSS in Applied Sociology

Graduate programs
 MBA (Regular)
 MBA (Executive)
 MA in English
 LL.M 
 MSc. in Mathematics
 MSc. in Mathematics
 Master of Public Health
 Master in Development Studies

Activities
North East University runs various extracurricular activities by –
 NEUB Sports Club
 Tourist Club
 Debate Club
 Social Services Club
 Cultural Club
 CSE Society
 Theater North East
 NEUB Photography Club.
 NEUB MS Woard
 NEUB Law students Forum.

References

Private universities in Bangladesh
Education in Sylhet
2012 establishments in Bangladesh
Educational institutions established in 2012